The bumped miner bee (Andrena nasonii) is a species of miner bee in the family Andrenidae. Another common name for this species is the Nason's andrena. It is found in Central America and North America. It is a generalist, collects pollen from many different plants.

References

Further reading

External links

 

nasonii
Articles created by Qbugbot
Insects described in 1895